Louis-Joseph Ernest Deproge, (15 August 1850 - December 1921) was a lawyer and deputy of Martinique from 1882 to 1898.

Biography

Education 
Ernest Deproge completed his primary education in Fort-de-France. He left for France, obtaining his baccalaureate in Rouen; he then began studying law in Paris. The Franco-Prussian War forced him to abandon his studies for a while to take part in the fighting. When the war ended, he resumed his university studies and obtained his law degree. Ernest Deproge returned to Martinique to practise law.

Political career 
It was the first newspaper founded and run by republican free men of color in Martinique. In 1880, he held the post of president of the General Council of Martinique for a year. In 1885, a rivalry between Deproge and Hurard caused the break-up of the Republican party. Ernest Deproge's assimilationist camp accused Marius Hurard of collusion with the autonomist Béké group. They each created their own political party. At the age of 48, Ernest Deproge left political life and Martinique. After a long illness, he died on the 19th December in Sanvic (Seine-Maritime), at the age of 71.

Memorials and legacy 
A street by the sea, near his family home in Fort-de-France, was named after him. In 1925, bust was unveiled at Place Fabien, a plaza between rue Isambert and rue Victor Sévère in Fort-de-France, Martinique. He is now considered a controversial figure of French colonialism in Martinique's history; in 2021, protesters pushed his bust off its plinth. The Martinique Heritage Database, a project of the General Council of Martinique, writes the following about how he is remembered:

Political career 

 Deputy of Martinique from 1882 to 1896
 President of the General Council 1880 to 1881

References

Bibliography

External links 

 Deproge's page on the National Assembly website

1850 births
1921 deaths
People from Fort-de-France
Martiniquais politicians
Republican Union (France) politicians
Members of the 3rd Chamber of Deputies of the French Third Republic
Members of the 4th Chamber of Deputies of the French Third Republic
Members of the 5th Chamber of Deputies of the French Third Republic
Members of the 6th Chamber of Deputies of the French Third Republic
Martiniquais lawyers
French military personnel of the Franco-Prussian War